Admiral Sir William Parker, 1st Baronet (1 January 1743 – 31 October 1802), was a British naval commander.

Naval career
William Parker's father, Augustine Parker, had been mayor of Queenborough, Isle of Sheppey, Kent and a commander of one of the king's yachts. William Parker entered the navy about 1756 and in 1758 was on  during the capture of Louisbourg in Canada and the capture of Quebec the following year. He was promoted to lieutenant in 1762. For a time he served off the coast of Newfoundland and was promoted to commander in 1763. In 1777 he went to the West Indies where he served under Byron. He served aboard various ships and as commodore and commander-in-chief on the Leeward Islands Station between 1787 and 1789. During the 1790s he served under Admiral Lord Howe. In 1794 he commanded  at the Battle of The Glorious First of June and was promoted to Rear-Admiral.

After service on the Jamaica Station in 1796, he took part under Sir John Jervis in the Battle of Cape St Vincent in 1797, where he damaged the 112-gun ship San Josef so badly that Commodore Horatio Nelson was able to board and capture her with little opposition. The following year Parker, on blockade duty off Cádiz, bitterly resented that Nelson, junior to himself, was given an independent command in the Mediterranean, but his letters to the Admiralty had no effect. He ended his career as Commander-in-Chief in North America at Halifax, Nova Scotia from 1800, and was recalled for disobeying orders.

References

Sources

|-

|-

|-

1743 births
1802 deaths
Baronets in the Baronetage of Great Britain
Royal Navy admirals
People from Warwickshire
British military personnel of the French and Indian War
Royal Navy personnel of the French Revolutionary Wars